Regnéville-sur-Mer is a commune in the Manche department in Normandy in north-western France.

See also
 Château de Regnéville
 Phare de la pointe d'Agon - Pointe d'Agon Lighthouse
 Les Fours à Chaux du Rey - Lime Kilns and Maritime Museum, Regnéville
Regnéville-sur-Mer official webpage
Communes of the Manche department

References

Regnevillesurmer
Populated coastal places in France